is a railway station in Nerima, Tokyo, Japan, operated by the private railway operator Seibu Railway and the Tokyo subway operator Toei Subway.

Lines
Nerima Station is served by the Seibu Ikebukuro Line, Seibu Yurakucho Line, and Seibu Toshima Line, and also by the Toei Ōedo Line subway.

Station layout
Nerima is an elevated station with two island platforms serving four tracks, with an additional outer track on either side used by passing trains. Elevators and escalators connect the platforms to the ticket entrances, and the station contains a waiting room as well.

The Toei station consists of an underground island platform serving two tracks.

Platforms

Seibu

Toei

History
The Seibu station opened on 15 April 1915. The Toei station opened on 10 December 1991.

The original ground-level station was rebuilt as an elevated station in 1997, and at the same time, the number of tracks was increased to six to allow non-stop trains to pass.

From 1998, inter-running of some services commenced to and from the Seibu Yurakucho Line.

Station numbering was introduced on all Seibu Railway lines during fiscal 2012, with Nerima Station becoming "SI06".

Passenger statistics
In fiscal 2013, the station was the fourth busiest on the Seibu network with an average of 118,601 passengers daily. In fiscal 2012, the Toei station was used by an average of 35,765 passengers daily (boarding passengers only). The passenger figures for the Seibu station in previous years are as shown below.

Cultural references 
The station and other parts of the Toei Ōedo Line are referenced in the Digimon Adventure franchise.

See also
 List of railway stations in Japan

References

External links

 Nerima Station information (Seibu Railway) 
 Nerima Station information (Toei) 

Seibu Ikebukuro Line
Seibu Yūrakuchō Line
Stations of Seibu Railway
Railway stations in Japan opened in 1915
Railway stations in Tokyo